Gauthier Pinaud (born 8 January 1988) is a French professional footballer who played most recently for Orléans as a right-back.

Career statistics

Notes

External links

Gauthier Pinaud foot-national.com Profile

1988 births
Living people
French footballers
Ligue 2 players
Championnat National players
Championnat National 2 players
Championnat National 3 players
LB Châteauroux players
RC Strasbourg Alsace players
US Orléans players
Association football midfielders